The London and North Western Railway (LNWR) 1400 Class, commonly known as Bill Baileys after the popular little music hall number "Won't You Come Home Bill Bailey", was a class of 30 4-cylinder 4-6-0 compound locomotives.   Essentially a Class B compound 0-8-0 with different wheel arrangement.  30 were built starting in 1903, intended for a mixed traffic role.  The first was withdrawn in 1913, with several more following during the First World War, cannibalised to keep Class Bs running.  None survived to the grouping of 1923; the last was withdrawn in 1921.

References 

 Goods Engines of LNWR - 1400 Class London and North Western Railway Society
 
 

1400 Class
Standard gauge steam locomotives of Great Britain
Scrapped locomotives
Railway locomotives introduced in 1903